Jeannine N. Bailliu is a Canadian economist who is currently the Associate Vice-President (Programs) at the C.D. Howe Institute in Toronto. Prior to joining the C.D. Howe Institute, Jeannine spent over twenty years working at the Bank of Canada, where she held a number of senior roles including Senior Policy Advisor and Director of Emerging Markets. Dr. Bailliu has published multiple scholarly articles, focusing her research on international economics, international finance and applied econometrics.

Jeannine was born in a British military hospital on January 12, 1968 in Iserlohn, West Germany. Her father, who was born in France, was an officer in the Canadian Armed Forces at the time. Jeannine is both a Canadian and French national. She has lived, studied and worked in many countries including Canada, Germany, France, Switzerland, Argentina and the United States.

Education 
Jeannine Bailliu attended high school at École Secondary Étienne-Brûlé and École Secondary Publique Louis-Riel. Bailliu completed her Bachelor of Commerce(B.Com.) in Honours at McGill University in 1990. In 1993, she received her master's degree in International Economics at the Graduate Institute of International and Development Studies in Geneve, Switzerland. Upon receiving her masters, Bailliu applied for her Doctor of Philosophy degree (PhD) in 1993 and obtained her PhD in Economics in 1999 at the University of California in Santa Cruz.

Career 
Upon obtaining her PhD in Economics, Bailliu worked for the Organization of Economic Co-operation and Development (OECD) in Paris. Afterwards, she started working for the Bank of Canada as a research advisor in 2005 for four years. In March 2005, Bailliu and Ramzi Issa published an internal note for the Bank which indicated that the Canadian dollar was undervalued. This received press coverage when it was released a year later under the Access to Information Act. As of 2010, Bailliu became an Assistant Chief of the Bank of Canada. As of September 2016, she obtained the position of the Senior Policy Advisor for the International Economic Analysis Department.

Some of Bailliu's recent research focuses on the Chinese economy, exchange rate and monetary policy regimes, and macroeconomic modelling. In 2016, Bailliu et al. published a working paper called "How Fast Can China Grow? The Middle Kingdom's Prospects to 2030" In addition, Bailliu also focuses a lot of her research on the economic growth of emerging market economies. In 2016, she published a paper called "Structural Reforms and Economic Growth in Emerging Market Economies" following structural reforms in the post 2008 Global Financial Crisis period. In 2000, Bailliu presented a paper with one her colleagues discussing exchange rate regimes and economic growth in emerging market economies. Her first article was published in July 2000, called "Private Capital Flows, Financial Development, and Economic Growth in Developing Countries", published by the Bank of Canada.

Scholarship and selected works

Research on the Chinese economy

How Fast Can China Grow? The Middle Kingdom's Prospects to 2030 (2016) 
Jeannine Bailliu co-authored this research with her colleagues Mark Kruger, Argyn Toktamyssov and Wheaton Welbourn. Bailliu et al. (2016) used a Cobb-Douglas production function to forecast the growth of the Chinese economy to 2030. They used four key determinants: capital stock growth, labour growth, human capital growth and total factor productivity (TFP) growth. Their research suggests that the Chinese economy is expected to decelerate its growth from its current 7% growth rate to roughly 5% by 2030. Their attribute this slow down in growth to a decrease in future investments.

The Transmission of Shocks to the Chinese Economy in a Global Context: A Model-Based Approach (2010) 
Baillui and colleague Patrick Blagrave analyze the factors behind shocks in the Chinese economy and how these shocks effect the G-3 countries, United States, the euro area and Japan Firstly, Baillui et al. (2010) find that foreign demand shocks are larger in China than other industrialized countries. This is namely due to the fact that China has a very open economy and one of the world's largest manufacturers. Henceforth, demand shocks from the international market will greatly impact the Chinese economy. In addition, their research also suggests that real equilibrium exchange rates are not only a large driving force for the Chinese economy but for the international market as well. Lastly, Baillui et al. (2010) argue that China's economy adapts slower to shocks than other developed countries because their monetary policy is not as effective as the real exchange rate.

Research on emerging market economies

Structural Reforms and Economic Growth in Emerging Market Economies (2016) 
Jeannine Bailliu and Christopher Hajzler suggest that growth in Emerging Market Economies (EME's) has slowed down since this 2008 Global Financial Crisis. Bailliu and Hajzler present structural reforms that could help increase productivity and thus help stimulate a substantial amount of growth following the financial crisis. Their research suggests that trade and foreign direct investment (FDI) liberalization, and strengthening property rights are key factors contributing to growth. Bailliu and Hajzler also suggest that investments in infrastructure and reforms to product market regulation (PMR) impact the level of growth in EME's. They mainly focus their research on emerging market economies such as China, India, Mexico, Brazil and Turkey.

Implications for Emerging-Market Economies (2000) 
In a conference held by the Bank of Canada in November 2000, Jeannine Bailliu and Robert Lafrance, and Jean-François Perrault presented a paper called "Exchange Rate Regimes and Economic Growth in Emerging Markets." They examine how exchange rates effect economic growth in 25 emerging market economies. Their findings suggest that flexible exchange rates are correlated with robust economic growth only when countries liberalize capital flows and already have an existing well-developed financial market.

First publication at the Bank of Canada

Private Capital Flows, Financial Development, Economic Growth and Developing Countries 
In July 2000, Bailliu published her paper on capital flows and economic growth in developing countries. Using data from 40 developing countries from 1975–95, Bailliu concludes that inward capital flows are positively correlated with economic growth in developing countries only when the country's domestic financial system is developed and stable. She suggests that inward capital flows will have negative effects on economic growth if the country has a poorly developed banking system. This is because governments of countries with underdeveloped banking systems could use the capital inflows for risky rather than productive investment.

Bank of Canada publications 
 2000, July:  "Private Capital Flows, Financial Development, Economic Growth and Developing Countries"
 2002, June: "Does Exchange Rate Matter for Growth?" with Robert Lafrance and Jean-Francios Perrault.
 2002, December: "Exchange Rate Regimes for Emerging Markets" with John Murray.
 2003, June: "Explaining and Forecasting Inflation in Emerging Markets: The Case of Mexico" with Daniel Garcés, Mark Kruger, and Miguel Messmacher.
 2004, May: "Exchange Rate Pass-Through in Industrialized Countries" with Hafedh Bouakez.
 2004, June: "Exchange Rate Pass-Through and the Inflation Environment in Industrialized Countries: An Empirical Investigation" with Eiji Fujii
 2005, October: "What Drives Movements in Exchange Rates?" with Micheal R. King
 2007, July: "Multilateral Adjustment and Exchange Rate Dynamics: The Case of Three Commodity Currencies" with Ali Dib, Takashi Kano, and Lawrence L. Schembri
 2010, July: "The Transmission of Shocks to the Chinese Economy in a Global Context: A Model-Based Approach" with Patrick Blagrave
 2010, November: "Has Exchange Rate Pass-Through Really Declined? Some Recent Insights from Literature" with Wei Dong and John Murray
 2012, February: "Household Borrowing and Spending in Canada" Katsiaryna Kartashova and Césaire Meh
 2012, February: "Macroprudential Rules and Monetary Policy when Financial Frictions Matter" with Césaire Meh and Yahong Zhang
 2016, April: "How Fast Can China Grow? The Middle Kingdom's Prospects to 2030" with Argyn Toktamyssov and Welbourn Wheaton.
 2016, November: "Structural Reforms and Economic Growth in Emerging Market Economies" with Christopher Hajzler
 2018, March: "Can Media and Text Analytics Provide Insights into Labour Market Conditions in China?"  Xinfen Han, Mark Kruger, Yu-Hsien Liu, and Sri Thanabalasingam

References 

Living people
Place of birth missing (living people)
Canadian economists
Canadian women economists
McGill University Faculty of Management alumni
University of California, Santa Cruz alumni
Graduate Institute of International and Development Studies alumni
OECD officials
1968 births